Little Murray River may refer to:

 Little Murray River (New South Wales), an anabranch of the Murray River, Australia; to the north
 Little Murray River (Victoria), an anabranch of the Murray River, Australia; to the south
 Little Murray River (Nymboida), a tributary of the Nymboida River

See also 
 Murray River (disambiguation)